Tetradifon is a miticide.

References

External links

Organochloride insecticides
Benzosulfones